Interesting Engineering is an online magazine covering topics such as innovation, science, culture, health, and transportation.

History
Hüseyin Kilic, a native of Turkey, founded Interesting Engineering on Blogspot in 2011 to improve his English language skills. The original blog is no longer online. The online magazine employs people in Turkey, the United States, Spain, India, and the United Kingdom.

Leadership team
Founder Kilic remains as CEO. Filiz Topcu is Vice President of Operations and Strategy. Vanessa Oberlaender is Executive Editor. Kutay Soysal is the Executive Editor of Video. Eric Frias is the Director of Revenue.

References in the media
Interesting Engineering articles, guides, and reports have been cited as supporting sources by:

 The New York Times
 CNN
 BBC
 Android Authority
 Tech Times
 Input
 Harvard Business Review

Audience
According to SimilarWeb, a digital intelligence provider, Interesting Engineering held a global rank of 21,952, a country rank of 10,249, and a News and Media (United States) category rank of 736 as of January 2022. The site received 3.9 million visits in January 2022, according to publicly available SimilarWeb data.

References

External links 
 Interesting Engineering

Internet properties established in 2011
Online magazines published in the United States
Engineering magazines
Science and technology magazines
Transport magazines